Tatyana Aleksandrovna Sychova (née Mekhanoshina, ; born 29 November 1957) is a Georgian long-distance runner. She twice represented the Soviet Union at the IAAF World Cross Country Championships, finishing fifth at the 1981 race and 45th at the 1980 race. Both times she shared in the team gold medals, running alongside teammates including Yelena Sipatova, Tatyana Sychova, Svetlana Ulmasova, Tatyana Pozdnyakova, Irina Bondarchuk, Giana Romanova, Yelena Chernysheva, and Raisa Smekhnova. She also ran at the 1981 European Cup, placing fourth in the 3000 metres.

At national level, she competed for Perm and was runner-up over 3000 m at the 1982 Soviet Indoor Athletics Championships behind Svetlana Ulmasova (setting a best of 8:55.04 minutes which remains a Georgian indoor record), runner-up to Nina Yapeyeva in the outdoor 3000 m at the 1981 Soviet Athletics Championships, seventh at the 1979 Spartakiad of the Peoples of the USSR, and third in the short race at the 1978 and 1979 Soviet Cross Country Championships.

She ran the second-fastest 3000 m time of the 1980 season, with her lifetime best of 8:33.9 minutes, set in Moscow in a runner-up performance oto world leader Sipatova.

International competitions

References

External links

1957 births
Living people
Sportspeople from Perm, Russia
Soviet female long-distance runners
Soviet female cross country runners
Female long-distance runners from Georgia (country)
Female cross country runners from Georgia (country)